Ants-Enno Lõhmus (born 17 March 1936 Tallinn) is an Estonian politician. He was a member of VII Riigikogu.

References

Living people
1936 births
Members of the Riigikogu, 1992–1995
Members of the Riigikogu, 1995–1999
Politicians from Tallinn